New Galloway is a town in the historical county of Kirkcudbrightshire in Dumfries and Galloway. Before the local government reform of 1975, it was the smallest Royal Burgh in Scotland.

History
There were scattered settlements in the area from at least the 13th century (when the nearby Kenmure Castle was first built), but the village was formally founded in the 17th century by the Viscount of Kenmure and granted Royal Burgh status in 1630 – this was to enable it to serve as a market town. However, Kirkcudbright, only  to the south, was larger and drew more traders. New Galloway thus grew very slowly and is the smallest Royal Burgh in Scotland.

New Galloway today is a rural town. It has a Town Hall, the CatStrand Arts and Visitor Centre, two churches, three pubs, and a golf club. A popular holiday destination, standing on the edge of the scenic Galloway Forest Park, it is on the Galloway Kite Trail, where red kites can be spotted at all times of the year. Each August, it hosts the Scottish Alternative Games in its small park.

Notable buildings
Notable buildings include:
Kells Parish Church of Scotland, built in 1822 to a design by local architect William McCandlish.  T-plan church with square tower at the centre of south wall. Interior reworked in 1911 following the original layout. The churchyard has  three ‘Adam and Eve’ stones of 1706–7, and  the grave of  Captain John Gordon's gamekeeper at Kenmure Castle, John Murray, who caught the largest recorded pike in Loch Ken in 1774.
St Margaret's Episcopalian Church was built in 1904 by W H Harrison, the chancel added in 1908 and the lychgate in 1912.
The Ken Bridge, which links the town with the main road on the east side of the valley, was built between 1820 and 1821 by the Scottish engineer, John Rennie, who also built the second London Bridge and Waterloo Bridge.
New Galloway Town Hall was restored in 1875.

Notable people
Notable people include James Faed Jnr, (1856-1920) artist, son of James Faed: he lived and died at his home "The Bungalow".

References

External links

 Scottish Alternative Games
 Galloway Kite Trail
Engraving of New Galloway by James Fittler in the digitised copy of Scotia Depicta, or the antiquities, castles, public buildings, noblemen and gentlemen's seats, cities, towns and picturesque scenery of Scotland, 1804 at National Library of Scotland

Towns in Dumfries and Galloway